Honoré Jean Aristide Husson (born in Paris on 1 July 1803, died in Meudon on 30 July 1864) was a French academic sculptor of the 19th century.

Biography
He was the pupil of David d'Angers. In 1827, he won the 2nd Prix de Rome in 1827 and in 1830 the first Prix de Rome. He lived in the Villa Medici from 1831 to 1836. Back in Paris, he participated in exhibitions from 1837 and won a 2nd class medal in 1837 and a first class medal in 1848. On 9 May 1853, he married Sophie Desiree Marie Tremblay in Paris.

Main works

Husson received many State orders, including :
 L'Ange gardien offrant à Dieu un pécheur repentant
 A bust of Louis Philippe for the Académie de l’Été et l’Automne
 Figures from one of the fountains of the Place de la Concorde, Rome, 1839
 Two busts of Boissy d'Anglas and Chancellor Dambray
 Marguerite de Provence, 1847, and Eustache Lesueur, 1853, Jardin du Luxembourg
 Summer and Autumn, figures of one of the fountains of the Place de la Concorde, 1839
 Statues of Voltaire and Bailly at Old City Hall
 Saint Bernard at the Madeleine
 Gouvion St Cyr at the Senate of France
 Anges en adoration, St. Vincent de Paul
 Statue of Clovis, Church of St. Clotilde
 Eustache Lesueur, Jacques Sarrazin and General Desaix the new Louvre
 Statue of Coulomb, Conservatoire des Arts et Métiers
 Dagobert, Tower of Saint Germain l'Auxerrois
 St. Mathias, St. Simon and St. Jude, Church of Saint Eustache

References

External links
 Works by Husson, on A&A, Art and Architecture

1803 births
1864 deaths
Artists from Paris
Prix de Rome for sculpture
19th-century French sculptors
French male sculptors
19th-century French male artists